Orchaise is a former commune in the Loir-et-Cher department of central France. On 1 January 2016, it was merged into the new commune of Valencisse. Its population was 931 in 2019.

Points of interest
Parc botanique du Prieuré d'Orchaise

See also
Communes of the Loir-et-Cher department

References 

Former communes of Loir-et-Cher